Evangelos, Vangelis (or, in polytonic orthography, ; from  "good" +  "messenger, angel") is a common Greek male name. The diminutive derived from the name Evangelos, is usually Vangelis. The female equivalent is Evangelía.

It is an ancient Greek name; in Greek mythology there are at least two personalities bearing the name. One was Pixodarus, a shepherd who discovered the marble from which the Temple of Artemis in Ephesus was built (one of the Seven Wonders of the Ancient World), and was thereafter worshiped as a god named Evangelos, because he brought the good news. The second was the successor of the prophet Branchus to the shrine of Miletus, called Evangelos because he was the one announcing the good oracles; he was at the origin of a clan of prophets, the Evangelides.

According to the Dictionary of Greek and Roman Biography and Mythology (Harper, New York, 1884), Evangelus was:
1. A Greek comic poet of the new comedy, a fragment of one of whose plays ie preserved by Athenaeus; edited by Meineke, Fragm. Comic. Graec., vol. ii., p. 1173, edit. minor.
2. A slave of Pericles, who distinguished himself by his abilities; he is said to have written a work on the science of war "Tactics", which was highly prized by Philopoemen.

Later, with the advent of Christianity, the name was connected to the "good word" of the Gospels (in Greek, Εὐαγγέλιον, evangélion, Evangile), and to the people bearing the good news (evangelists), as well as to the Annunciation itself (in Greek ), meaning the bringing of the good news to Virgin Mary by Archangel Gabriel, that she was going to conceive Jesus.

Name day
Bearers of the name Evangelos celebrate their name day on March 25, as the Annunciation, is celebrated in churches on that day.

Famous Greek people bearing the name
Evangelos Averoff-Tositsas (1910–1990), conservative Greek politician, writer and industrialist
Evangelos Damaskos, Greek light athlete active in the nineteenth century
Evangelos Mantzios (b. 1983), Greek footballer
Evangelos "Vangelis" Moras (b. 1981), Greek footballer
Evangelos Nessos (b. 1978), former German footballer of Greek ancestry
Evangelos Venizelos (b. 1957), Greek jurist and politician (former leader of the centre-left party PASOK)
Evangelos Zappas (1800–1865), Greek merchant
Evangelos Odysseas "Vangelis" Papathanassiou (1943–2022), composer of electronic, progressive, ambient, jazz, pop rock, and orchestral music.
Vangelis Katsanis ((died 2009), playwright, famous for "The Successors," an extremely anti-royalist play which resulted in Katsanis' exile

Variants
 Vangélis, Vángos, the most common diminutives of this name
 Evangelía, Vangelió, Vangelítsa, the female variant

See also
Evangelos Florakis Naval Base

References

Greek masculine given names